The  is a river in the south-eastern part of Hyōgo Prefecture. This river was selected as the second most important river in the region by the prefecture governor. Its total length is 66 kilometers, and the drainage area is 496 square kilometers.

Description
It flows through the Sanda Basin, and creates the Mukogawa Keikoku Ravine between Sanda and Takarazuka. It continues into Osaka Plain at Takarazuka, and flows in the Osaka Metropolitan Area to create the borders between Takarazuka and Itami as well as between Nishinomiya and Amagasaki.

Major tributaries

Aonogawa River in Sasayama
Arimagawa River in Kobe and Nishinomiya
Arinogawa River in Kobe
Hatsukagawa River in Nose, Sanda, Takarazuka and Kobe
Sakasegawa River in Takarazuka
Nigawa River in Takarazuka
Edagawa River in Nishinomiya

References 

Rivers of Hyōgo Prefecture
Rivers of Japan